West End Saloon, also known as Paddy Malone's, is a historic commercial building located at Jefferson City, Cole County, Missouri. It was built in 1863, and expanded and enlarged between 1892 and 1898.  It is a three-story, rectangular, Second Empire style brick building.  It features a mansard roof.

It was listed on the National Register of Historic Places in 2014.

References

Commercial buildings on the National Register of Historic Places in Missouri
Second Empire architecture in Missouri
Commercial buildings completed in 1898
Buildings and structures in Jefferson City, Missouri
National Register of Historic Places in Cole County, Missouri